Bo Diddley Is a Lover is the sixth album by musician Bo Diddley recorded in 1961 and released on the Checker label.

Reception

AllMusic awarded the album 4 stars with reviewer Bruce Eder stating "There's not a bad song on this long-forgotten album; in fact, it's all good, and so little of it has been reissued that it's a crime. ... Find it, buy it, and savor it".

Track listing 
All tracks credited to Ellas McDaniel 
 "Not Guilty" – 2:16
 "Hong Kong, Mississippi" – 3:03
 "You're Looking Good" – 2:27
 "Bo's Vacation" – 2:52
 "Congo" – 2:44
 "Bo's Blues" – 2:42
 "Bo Diddley Is a Lover" – 2:37
 "Aztec" – 2:33
 "Back Home" – 2:33	
 "Bo Diddley Is Loose" – 3:06	
 "Love Is a Secret" – 3:09
 "Quick Draw" – 1:55

Personnel 
Bo Diddley – vocals, guitar
Peggy Jones – guitar, background vocals
Jesse James Johnson – bass
Billy "Dino" Downing, Edell "Red" Robertson – drums
Jerome Green – maracas, backing vocals
The Moonglows (track 3); Carrie Mingo, Grace Ruffin, Margie Clark, Sandra Bears (tracks 1, 7 & 11) – background vocals

References 

1961 albums
Bo Diddley albums
Checker Records albums
Albums produced by Phil Chess
Albums produced by Leonard Chess